"Can't Keep Johnny Down" is a song by American alternative rock band They Might Be Giants. The song was released as a promotional single from the band's 2011 album, Join Us. Like all the artwork surrounding the Join Us album, the cover art and labels for the disc were designed by the Office of Paul Sahre.

Composition 
"Can't Keep Johnny Down" was written by John Linnell. Linnell claims that the song is not a biographical song about himself or fellow band member John Flansburgh, though the character's name was selected intentionally, in order to create a contrast between his personality and that of the two Johns. John Flansburgh describes the song as "...a song of defiance. It's an incredibly catchy song. That's a very nice, bittersweet concoction of a very bitchy lyric with an incredibly sunny arrangement. It's sort of Britpop." He adds that he found the song to be a very strong track. Flansburgh also said, of the titular character, "The lyric is about a guy who seems like he's got some mixed emotions about the world. He's sort of reading everything in a hostile way."

Reception 
Rated as one of the best songs of 2011, PopMatters said the song was Smiths-like, as the, "song's malcontent narrator, singing about imagined triumphs over imagined slights, hits a similarly sweet-and-sour tone. Then again, marrying catchy melodies to dark lyrics has always been their specialty; this instant classic proves it's a talent undiminished by time." The A.V. Club noted the song kicks off Join Us, "in winning fashion, showcasing Linnell’s surprising late-career ability to craft a slick pop tune."

Music video 
The music video for "Can't Keep Johnny Down" was released by the band via YouTube on October 4, 2011. It was the band's first live action music video since 2004. The video was directed by Brad and Brian Palmer and stars Rip Torn. John Linnell and John Flansburgh are not featured in the music video.

They Might Be Giants also held a contest for fans to create an unofficial music video for the song. About 100 amateur videos were submitted. The winner and  several runners-up were selected by John Hodgman, who also wrote up his favourite videos on his website. The winning video was created by Mohit Jaswal, Eduardo Urueana, and Justin Dean, who received a prize of $1,000. Runners-up received free pizzas. Both the official video and the winning music video were included as a video downloads with purchases of the They Might Be Giants rarities compilation, Album Raises New And Troubling Questions, from the band's website. The videos were also collected for the band's 2013 music video compilation, Them Ain't Big Eye Ants.

Personnel 
They Might Be Giants
John Flansburgh - vocals, electric guitar
John Linnell - vocals, keyboards

Backing band
Marty Beller - drums
Dan Miller - acoustic guitar
Danny Weinkauf - bass

Production
They Might Be Giants and Pat Dillett - producers
Jon Altschuler and Greg Thompson - engineers
Pat Dillett - mixing

References

External links
"Can't Keep Johnny Down" single on This Might Be A Wiki
"Can't Keep Johnny Down" (song) on This Might Be A Wiki

2011 singles
They Might Be Giants songs
2011 songs
Rounder Records singles
Songs written by John Linnell
Songs written by John Flansburgh